EQE may refer to:

External quantum efficiency
European qualifying examination, a multi-day examination to become a European patent attorney
Mercedes-Benz EQE, an electric sedan
Mercedes-Benz EQE SUV, an electric sport utility vehicle

See also
 Eqe Bay, Nunavut, Canada